Mark Fredrick Noble (born 30 September 1962) is a New Zealand chess and lawn bowls player. He was awarded the title of International Correspondence Chess Grandmaster (GM) in 2010, the first New Zealand player to be awarded this title.

At the age of 13, he was disabled after being hit by a car, smashing his left hip. However, as a lawn bowler, he generally competes with able-bodied players.

Noble competed in the Open para-sport triples event at the 2014 Commonwealth Games where he won the silver medal with teammates Lynda Bennett and Barry Wynks. He won another silver medal, along with teammates Bruce Wakefield and Barry Wynks, in the Open para-sport triples event at the 2018 Commonwealth Games.

Lawn bowls titles
 Wellington Open Titles 14
 Wellington Super Bowls 1
 Taranaki Super Bowls 1
 Manawatu Open Titles 9
 Wairarapa Open Titles 3
 Wanganui Open Title 1
 Takaro Pro Pairs 2019 Gold (Skip)
 New Zealand Open Titles 2
 New Zealand Astro Mixed Triples 1
 2003 World Disabled Triples Gold (Skip)
 2003 World Disabled Pairs Bronze (Skip)
 Commonwealth Games 2014 Glasgow Silver Medal  (Skip)
 2017 International 8 Nations Silver Medal   (Skip)
 Commonwealth Games 2018 Gold Coast Silver Medal (Skip)
 New Zealand Disabled Singles 2018 Gold
 New Zealand Disabled Pairs 2018 Gold (Skip)
 Taranaki Open Fours Semi Final 2021 (Skip)
 New Zealand Bowls 3 Five 2022 Silver (Skip}

Chess placings
Over The Board Titles:
 Fide Master Title 1992
 North Island Champion 1993 1st=
 North Island Champion 2015 1st
 North Island Blitz Champion 2015 1st
 North Island Championship Senior Champion 2015 1st
 North Island Blitz Senior Champion 2016 1st
 North Island Rapid Senior Champion 2015 1st
 North Island Rapid Senior Champion 2016 1st
 North Island Championship Senior Champion 2016 1st
 North Island Championship 2016 1st=
 South Island Championship 2015 1st=
 South Island Rapid Championship 2015 1st=
 New Zealand Rapid Champion 1995 1st=
 New Zealand Rapid Champion 2016 1st=
 New Zealand Senior Champion 2018 1st=

Correspondence Title & Events
 ICCF International Master Title 1991 (IM)
 ICCF Senior Master Title 2007 (SM)
 ICCF Grandmaster Title 2010 (GM)
 28th World Chess Championship Final  3rd=
 8th Interzonal Team Championship (Board 1) 1st Gold Medal
 5th Chess 960 World Cup Final 1st=

George Stibal Memorial 2011
 George Stibal Memorial 1st (plus GM Norm)

British Team Championships
 1st British Team Championship 1st
 2nd British Team Championship 1st
 3rd British Team Championship 1st

Asian Championships:
 4th Asian Championship 1st 
 5th Asian Championship 1st

Afro-Asian Zonal Championship:
 9th Afro-Asian Championship 1st
 12th Afro-Asian Championship 1st

New Zealand Correspondence Championships, a record 14 times:
 55th New Zealand Championship 1988 1st Equal
 72nd New Zealand Championship 2005 1st Equal
 74th New Zealand Championship 2007 1st Equal
 75th New Zealand Championship 2008 1st
 76th New Zealand Championship 2009 1st
 77th New Zealand Championship 2010 1st
 78th New Zealand Championship 2011 1st Equal
 79th New Zealand Championship 2012 1st
 80th New Zealand Championship 2013 1st
 81st New Zealand Championship 2014 1st Equal
 82nd New Zealand Championship 2015 1st
 83rd New Zealand Championship 2016 1st
 84th New Zealand Championship 2017 1st
 88th New Zealand Championship 2021 1st Equal

References

External links
 
 
 
 

1962 births
Living people
New Zealand chess players
Correspondence chess grandmasters
Chess FIDE Masters
New Zealand male bowls players
Commonwealth Games medallists in lawn bowls
Commonwealth Games silver medallists for New Zealand
Bowls players at the 2014 Commonwealth Games
Bowls players at the 2018 Commonwealth Games
20th-century New Zealand people
21st-century New Zealand people
Medallists at the 2014 Commonwealth Games